Puenkon Tor.Surat is a Thai Muay Thai fighter.

Titles and accomplishments

Rajadamnern Stadium
 2016 Rajadamnern Stadium 115 lbs Champion
 2016 Rajadamnern Stadium Fighter of the Year

Awards
 2016 Sports Authority of Thailand Fighter of the Year
 2016 Siam Kela Fighter of the Year

Fight record

|-  style="background:#fbb;"
| 2022-05-26 || Loss ||align=left| Petchthailand Mor.Rajabhatsurin ||Petchyindee, Rajadamnern Stadium || Bangkok, Thailand || Decision || 5||3:00
|-  style="background:#fbb;"
| 2022-04-21 || Loss ||align=left| Petchsila Wor.Auracha ||Petchyindee, Rajadamnern Stadium || Bangkok, Thailand || Decision || 5 || 3:00
|-  style="background:#fbb;"
| 2022-01-21|| Loss ||align=left| Kumandoi PetchyindeeAcademy ||Petchyindee, Rangsit Stadium ||Rangsit, Thailand || Decision ||5 ||3:00
|-  style="background:#fbb;"
| 2021-04-08|| Loss ||align=left| Saoek Sitchefboontham || SuekMahakamMuayRuamPonKon Chana + Petchyindee|| Songkhla province, Thailand || Decision || 5 || 3:00
|-  style="background:#cfc;"
| 2021-03-13|| Win||align=left| Diesellek Wor.Wanchai|| Majujaya Muay Thai, Temporary Outdoors Stadium || Pattani, Thailand ||Decision ||5 ||3:00
|-  style="background:#cfc;"
| 2020-12-11|| Win||align=left| Saotho Sitchefboontham|| True4U Muaymanwansuk, Rangsit Stadium || Rangsit, Thailand ||Decision ||5 ||3:00
|-  style="background:#cfc;"
| 2020-11-06|| Win||align=left| Rungnarai Kiatmuu9  || True4U Muaymanwansuk, Rangsit Stadium || Rangsit, Thailand ||KO (Elbow)||4 || 1:45
|-  style="background:#cfc;"
| 2020-10-09|| Win||align=left| Phetsommai Sor.Sommai  || True4U Muaymanwansuk, Rangsit Stadium || Rangsit, Thailand ||Decision ||5 ||3:00
|-  style="background:#cfc;"
| 2020-09-04|| Win||align=left| Yodpot Nor.AnuwatGym || True4U Muaymanwansuk, Rangsit Stadium || Rangsit, Thailand || Decision ||5 ||3:00
|-  style="background:#fbb;"
| 2020-07-24 || Loss ||align=left| Rungnarai Kiatmuu9 || True4U Muaymanwansuk, Rangsit Stadium || Rangsit, Thailand || Decision || 5 || 3:00
|-  style="background:#fbb;"
| 2020-03-05|| Loss||align=left| Kongchai Chanaidonmuang || Rajadamnern Stadium || Bangkok, Thailand || Decision || 5 || 3:00
|-  style="background:#cfc;"
| 2020-01-30|| Win ||align=left| Petchhuahin Por.Petchkaikaew || Rajadamnern Stadium || Bangkok, Thailand || Decision || 5 || 3:00
|-  style="background:#fbb;"
| 2019-12-12|| Loss||align=left| Kumandoi Petcharoenvit || Rajadamnern Stadium || Bangkok, Thailand || Decision || 5 || 3:00
|-  style="background:#cfc;"
| 2019-10-17|| Win ||align=left| Phetsuphan Por.Daorungruang || Rajadamnern Stadium || Bangkok, Thailand || Decision || 5 || 3:00
|-  style="background:#fbb;"
| 2019-08-29|| Loss||align=left| Kumandoi Petcharoenvit || Rajadamnern Stadium || Bangkok, Thailand || Decision || 5 || 3:00
|-  style="background:#fbb;"
| 2019-05-29|| Loss||align=left| Wanchalong PK.Saenchai || Singmawin Rajadamnern Stadium || Bangkok, Thailand || KO (Left high kick) || 4 ||
|-  style="background:#cfc;"
| 2019-01-24|| Win||align=left| Kumandoi Petcharoenvit || Rajadamnern Stadium || Bangkok, Thailand || Decision || 5 || 3:00
|-  style="background:#fbb;"
| 2018-12-06|| Loss||align=left| Phetsuphan Por.Daorungruang || Rajadamnern Stadium || Bangkok, Thailand || Decision || 5 || 3:00
|-  style="background:#fbb;"
| 2018-10-25|| Loss||align=left| Diesellek Wor.Wanchai || Rajadamnern Stadium || Bangkok, Thailand || Decision || 5 || 3:00 
|-
! style=background:white colspan=9 |
|-  style="background:#fbb;"
| 2018-07-26|| Loss ||align=left| Yothin FA Group || Rajadamnern Stadium || Bangkok, Thailand || Decision  || 5 || 3:00
|-  style="background:#cfc;"
| 2018-06-06|| Win||align=left| Pichitchai PKsaenchaimuaythaigym || Rajadamnern Stadium || Bangkok, Thailand || Decision  || 5 || 3:00
|-  style="background:#fbb;"
| 2017-11-28|| Loss ||align=left| Kompatak SinbiMuayThai || Lumpinee Stadium || Bangkok, Thailand || KO (High Kick) || 1 ||
|-  style="background:#cfc;"
| 2017-11-05|| Win||align=left| Pichitchai PKsaenchaimuaythaigym || Rajadamnern Stadium || Bangkok, Thailand || Decision  || 5 || 3:00
|-  style="background:#cfc;"
| 2017-07-13|| Win ||align=left| Kumandoi Petcharoenvit || Rajadamnern Stadium || Bangkok, Thailand || KO || 3 ||
|-  style="background:#fbb;"
| 2017-06-07|| Loss||align=left| Wanchalong PK.Saenchai || Rajadamnern Stadium || Bangkok, Thailand || Decision || 5 || 3:00
|-  style="background:#cfc;"
| 2017-05-03|| Win||align=left| Kumandoi Petcharoenvit || Rajadamnern Stadium || Bangkok, Thailand || Decision || 5 || 3:00
|-  style="background:#fbb;"
| 2017-03-30|| Loss||align=left| Prajanchai P.K.Saenchaimuaythaigym || Rajadamnern Stadium || Bangkok, Thailand || Decision || 5 || 3:00
|-  style="background:#cfc;"
| 2017-02-08|| Win||align=left| Prajanchai P.K.Saenchaimuaythaigym || Rajadamnern Stadium || Bangkok, Thailand || Decision || 5 || 3:00
|-  style="background:#cfc;"
| 2016-12-21|| Win||align=left| Gingsanglek Tor.Laksong || Rajadamnern Stadium || Bangkok, Thailand || KO (Left Knee to the Body) || 4 ||  
|-
! style=background:white colspan=9 |
|-  style="background:#cfc;"
| 2016-11-30|| Win||align=left| Kumandoi Petcharoenvit || Rajadamnern Stadium || Bangkok, Thailand || Decision || 5 || 3:00
|-  style="background:#cfc;"
| 2016-10-13|| Win||align=left| Gingsanglek Tor.Laksong || Rajadamnern Stadium || Bangkok, Thailand || Decision || 5 || 3:00
|-  style="background:#cfc;"
| 2016-09-14|| Win||align=left| Pichitchai PKsaenchaimuaythaigym || Rajadamnern Stadium || Bangkok, Thailand || Decision  || 5 || 3:00
|-  style="background:#cfc;"
| 2016-07-21|| Win||align=left| Pichitchai PKsaenchaimuaythaigym || Rajadamnern Stadium || Bangkok, Thailand || Decision  || 5 || 3:00
|-  style="background:#cfc;"
| 2016-06-09|| Win||align=left| Prajanban Sor.Jor.Wichitmuangpadrew || Rajadamnern Stadium || Bangkok, Thailand || Decision  || 5 || 3:00 
|-
! style=background:white colspan=9 |
|-  style="background:#cfc;"
| 2016-05-04|| Win||align=left| Roychueng Singmawin || Rajadamnern Stadium || Bangkok, Thailand || Decision  || 5 || 3:00
|-  style="background:#cfc;"
| 2016-04-06|| Win||align=left| Suriyanlek Aor.Bor.Tor. Kampee || Rajadamnern Stadium || Bangkok, Thailand || Decision  || 5 || 3:00
|-  style="background:#cfc;"
| 2016-03-03|| Win||align=left|  Phetmuangchon Por.Suantong || Rajadamnern Stadium || Bangkok, Thailand || Decision  || 5 || 3:00
|-  style="background:#cfc;"
| 2016-01-27|| Win||align=left|  Phetmuangchon Por.Suantong || Rajadamnern Stadium || Bangkok, Thailand || Decision  || 5 || 3:00
|-  style="background:#cfc;"
| 2015-12-28|| Win||align=left| Phethevada BSJ.Sungnern || Rajadamnern Stadium || Bangkok, Thailand || KO   || 5 ||
|-  style="background:#cfc;"
| 2015-10-31|| Win||align=left| Yodpadang TBM Gym || Montri Studio || Bangkok, Thailand || KO || 2 ||
|-  style="background:#fbb;"
| 2014-10-24|| Loss ||align=left| Yodasawin Phor.Boonsit || Rajadamnern Stadium || Bangkok, Thailand || Decision  || 5 || 3:00

|-  style="background:#cfc;"
| 2014-09-20|| Win||align=left|  Lamnamoonlek Nuikafeboran || Omnoi Stadium || Bangkok, Thailand || Decision  || 5 || 3:00

|-  style="background:#fbb;"
| 2014-08-18|| Loss ||align=left| Petchsuntree Jitmuangnon || Rajadamnern Stadium || Bangkok, Thailand || Decision  || 5 || 3:00
|-  style="background:#cfc;"
| 2013-07-16|| Win ||align=left| Detkart Por Pongsawang || Rajadamnern Stadium || Bangkok, Thailand || KO (Low Kick)|| 2 ||
|- style="background:#fbb;"
| 2013-05-02|| Loss ||align=left| Rodtang Jitmuangnon || Thepprasit Stadium || Pattaya, Thailand || Decision || 5 || 3:00
|- style="background:#fbb;"
| 2011-02-21|| Loss ||align=left| Panpayak Jitmuangnon || Rajadamnern Stadium || Bangkok, Thailand || Decision || 5 || 3:00 
|-
| colspan=9 | Legend:

References

Puenkon Tor.Surat
Living people
1997 births
Puenkon Tor.Surat